Axel Kjerulf  (July 24, 1884 – September 19, 1964) was a Danish composer.

See also
List of Danish composers

References
This article was initially translated from the Danish Wikipedia.

Danish composers
Danish music historians
Male composers
1884 births
1964 deaths
20th-century male musicians